Metropolia University of Applied Sciences is the largest University of Applied Sciences in Finland. The university has four fields of study: culture, business, health care and social services, and technology. Teaching is also provided in English.

The number of students is 16,200 and the staff about 930. In the year 2019 nearly 2,794 Bachelor's and 477 Master's students graduated from Metropolia.

Metropolia's background

EVTEK University of Applied Sciences and Helsinki Polytechnic Stadia merged into Metropolia University of Applied Sciences on 1 August 2008. Since then, the operations were moved from 20+ premises, to 4 modern campuses.

International Metropolia

Metropolia University of Applied Sciences is one of the most international universities of applied sciences in Finland. Six international degree programmes, student and teacher mobility, work placement opportunities abroad and various projects play an essential role in the international activities at Metropolia. Over 1,450 foreign students representing 90 nationalities study in Metropolia. Some 550 Metropolitan students visit partner schools abroad as exchanges of over 3 months and about 450 exchange students come to Metropolia. Metropolia has over 400 partner universities around the world.

Staff

In the year 2019 the number of staff was 933, including 224 teachers with research degrees. Metropolia takes part in international staff exchanges. Summer ICT School is fully organized by teachers from abroad.

Organization

Metropolia is an LTD-company. The shareholders in the company are the capital region cities Helsinki, Espoo, Vantaa and Kauniainen and the municipality of Kirkkonummi.

The managing director, President is Ms Riitta Konkola.

The Board of Directors starting 10 May 2019 

 Chairperson Henri Kuitunen, Helsinki
 Elina Lehto-Häggroth, Vantaa
 Martti Lipponen, Vantaa
 Kalevi Ekman, Espoo
 Harri Rinta-aho, Espoo
 Tuula Saxholm, Helsinki
 Liisa Pohjolainen, Helsinki
 Kirsti Hämäläinen, staff representative
 Valtteri Markula, student representative

Campuses 

Metropolia is located in Helsinki Metropolitan Area. Currently Metropolia concentrates its operations on four campuses: Arabia and Myllypuro Campuses in Helsinki, Karamalmi Campus in Espoo and Myyrmäki Campus in Vantaa.

Helsinki
Myllypuro Campus
Campus teaching students in medical field and architecture. The newest campus, opened in January 2019 with 3000 students and 250 employees. The second part of the campus was opened in January 2020. Currently, about 6000 students are attending this campus. The entire project cost about 165 million euros.
Arabia Campus
Creative Campus, hosting lessons mainly dedicated to culture, conservation and design.

Vantaa
Myyrmäki Campus
Campus for sustainable technology and business. There are now 3500 students and 230 staff members operating on the campus in the fields of industrial technologies and international business. The construction of the last extension of this campus was finished in August 2018.

Espoo
Karamalmi Campus
Developer Campus for Smart Solutions. Metropolia's new Developer Campus for Smart Solutions in Karamalmi, Espoo was opened in August 2019. Leppävaara Campus in Espoo was closed on March 4, 2019, due to safety reasons. The property owner, City of Espoo, informed Metropolia about the poor condition of the campus structures on Feb 14, 2019 and urged Metropolia to move campus activities away as soon as possible to maximize students and staff members security.

Other premises

Helsinki 

 Arabia Campus: Arabiankatu 2
 Arabia Campus: Hämeentie 161
 Kaupintie

Espoo 

 Koskelo Hall

Academics
Metropolia currently has 43 bachelor's degrees. The awarding titles vary, depending on the chosen field. Some of them, but not limited are: bachelor of engineering, bachelor of business administration, bachelor of health care, bachelor of social services, bachelor of culture and arts. There are also 26 master-level studies. As university of applied sciences, Metropolia does not offer doctoral studies. Thanks to ongoing Bologna process, alumni of bachelor's degree from Metropolia are eligible to master-level programs in traditional universities.

Metropolia educates students  in the fields of Business, Culture, Health care and Social services, and Technology. Differences in each study programme are visible from the very beginning, as many of them are specialized in given field.

Metropolia takes part in the Finnish Joint Application. After meeting basic requirements for the undergraduate studies, international applicants take part in entrance examination organized by Metropolia. The contents of this test is different for every degree. Future students are selected based on their score. Applicants may also apply by using SAT test results. Minimum scores for every degree may vary, but they average around 1250 points.

International relations 

Metropolia University of Applied Sciences is one of the most international universities of applied sciences in Finland. International activities at Metropolia include international degree programmes, student and teacher mobility, work placement opportunities abroad and various projects.

 Erasmus+
 La Trobe University
 Kwantlen Polytechnic University
 Lakehead University
 University of Saskatchewan
 Chitkara University
 Heimerer College
 Universiti Teknologi Malaysia
 Namibia University of Science and Technology
 Durban University of Technology
 International Institute of Health Sciences
 University of Colombo
 Weber State University
 Texas Tech University
 The Hong Kong University of Science and Technology
 Tokyo National College of Technology (TNCT)
 Sendai National College of Technology
 Universiti Sains Malaysia
 Universiti Teknologi Malaysia
 Polytechnic of Namibia
 Unitec Institute of Technology: Civil Engineering
 Peter the Great Saint-Petersburg Polytechnical University
 St. Petersburg State University of Economics
 Temasek Polytecnic
 Ajou University
 Kyungpook National University 
 Seoul National University of Science and Technology
 Haute Ecole d'Ingénierie et de Gestion du Canton de Vaud (HEIG-VD)
 Yuan Ze University
 Sirindhorn International Institute of Technology (SIIT)
 Oregon Institute of Technology, Klamath Falls
 Temple University
 Toyo University 
 Lingnan University
 Donghua University
 Minnesota State University in Mankato

Networks 

 European Association for International Education (EAIE)
 HUMINT, (Human Resource Management)
 Nice Network
 Association Européenne des Conservatoires (AEC)
 ANMA, Nordiska Konservatoriorådet
 European Network for Conservation-Restoration Education (ENCoRE)
 European network on cultural management and policy (ENCATC)
 International Association of Film and Television Schools (CILECT)
 International Association of Jazz Educators (IAJE)
 International Association of Schools of Jazz (IASJ)
 International Council of Museums - Committee for Conservation (ICOM-CC)
 International Institute for Conservation (IIC)
 Cumulus, International Association of Universities and Colleges of Art, Design and Media
 Consortium of Higher Education in Health and Rehabilitation in Europe (COHEHRE)
 European Association of Training Centres for Socio-Educational Care Work (FESET)
 European Network of Occupational Therapy (ENOTHE)
 World Federation on Occupational Therapy (WFOT)
 European Network for Physiotherapy in Higher Education (ENPHE)
 European Network of Podiatry in Higher Education (ENPODHE)
 Osteopathic European Academic Network (OSEAN)
 The European Council of Optometry and Optics (ECOO) 
 The European Academy of Optometry and Optics (EAOO)
 European Society for Engineering Education (SEFI)
 Network for the Development of European Programmes in Higher Education (BUSINET)
 UNESCO International Centre for Engineering Education (UICEE)
 FEANI:European Federation of National Engineering Associations

Studies

Business 
All undergraduate business studies at Metropolia lead to the bachelor of business administration degree. Some learning pathways offer the option to gain double degree with partner institutions. Metropolia had the highest ranked business teaching in any Finnish University of Applied Sciences business programme in 2017.

Teaching takes place at the  Myyrmäki Campus. The school offers three bachelor-level business studies, two of them in English. Metropolia also offers learning pathways leading to MBA degree.

Health care and Social services 
Metropolia conducts many degrees in the fields of health care and social services. There are two bachelor's degrees in English (nursing and social services) and 15 in Finnish. The school also offers master-level studies leading to the MHA (master of health care) degree. All degrees in this fields are hosted in Myllypuro Campus.

Metropolia pilots special learning environment, called Well-being and Health Village. In this place, students provide free medical services under  supervision. The idea behind Village is to give students a taste of real-world medical work experience. Some of the services are: prosthetics and orthotics services, osteopathy services, physiotherapy services.

Culture 
All teaching in the culture field is in Finnish. There are 8 undergraduate degrees and 7 master's degrees. All teaching takes places at the Arabia Campus and nearby premises. Metropolia UAS is the first Finnish university to offer a degree focused in its entirety on XR design.

Technology 
Studies in the field of technology take place in two campuses. Myyrmäki campus mainly focuses on industrial technology, and teaching in  Karamalmi campus is more IT-based. Metropolia has a wide variety of industrial degrees, such as automotive engineering or industrial management. All industrial-based studies are conducted in Finnish. The school has two IT programs, one of them in English.

RDI 
Metropolia publishes around 100 RDI projects each year in cooperation with partner networks. Right now, Metropolia focuses its research on five phenomenon-based innovation hubs. In 2018, Metropolia's external RDI income amounted to about EUR 5.4 million. One of the most prominent projects is Sohjoa Baltic, that promotes and pilots automated driverless electric minibuses as part of the public transport chain, especially for the first/last mile connectivity. Sohjoa Baltic consortium has partners from Finland, Estonia, Sweden, Latvia, Germany, Poland, Norway and Denmark.

Innovation hubs 

 Clean and Sustainable Solutions
 Customer-oriented Wellbeing and Health Services
 Data-driven Construction
 Functional City for People
 Smart Mobility

Other RDI programs 

 Service Robotics
 Customer-oriented Technology Applications
 Urban Farm
 Sohjoa Baltic

References

Education in Helsinki
2007 establishments in Finland